The Belgian professional football awards is a collection of awards given at the end of each season since 1983. Back then, the only award was the Manager of the Year. There are now 5 main awards: Footballer, Footballer (second division), Goalkeeper, Manager and Referee. The previous fifth award, the Young Footballer of the Year Award, was not awarded between 2008–09 and 2012–13. The voters are all the players from the Belgian Pro League as well as the Belgian footballers playing abroad at the highest level. The ceremony is organized together by the paper Sport Foot Magazine and the Belgian Football Association.

Palmares

Professional Footballer of the Year

Young Professional Footballer of the Year

Professional Goalkeeper of the Year

Professional Manager of the Year

Professional Referee of the Year

Professional Footballer of the Year (Second Division)

External links
 Sport.be (archived) 
 Sporza 2022 winner  

Professional football awards
Professional football
1983 establishments in Belgium
Awards established in 1983
Annual events in Belgium